The InterAction Council is an independent non-profit organization that brings together former world leaders to mobilize their energy, experience and international contacts in an effort to develop recommendations and foster co-operation and positive action around the world.

Founded in 1983, this body meets on annually and is composed of 40 former world leaders. The organization and its members jointly develop recommendations on, and practical solutions for, the political, economic and social problems confronting humanity. These efforts are focused on three main priority areas: peace and security, world economic revitalization and universal ethical standards.

One of its most well-known initiatives was the development of a draft Universal Declaration of Human Responsibilities, which was an attempt to propose a set of responsibilities that were shared by all individuals to counterbalance the United Nations Universal Declaration of Human Rights. This new "global ethic" would provide a foundation of freedom, justice and peace in order for universal rights to be meaningful. These agreed values and standards complement universal rights, as the maximization of personal freedom at the expense of others, without consideration of others, is as problematic as having no rights at all.

The current Secretary General is Tom Axworthy (2011-present).

Members
 Franz Vranitzky, Honorary Co-chair and Chancellor of Austria (1986-1997)
 Jean Chrétien, Honorary Co-chair and Prime Minister of Canada (1993-2003)
 Olusegun Obasanjo, Co-chair and President of Nigeria (1976–79, 1999-2007)
 Bertie Ahern, Co-chair and Taoiseach of Ireland (1997-2008)
 James Bolger, Prime Minister of New Zealand (1990-1997)
 Gro Harlem Brundtland, Prime Minister of Norway (1981, 1986-1989, 1990-1996)
 Vigdís Finnbogadóttir, President of Iceland (1980-1996)
 Bill Clinton, President of the United States (1993-2001)
 Fernando de la Rúa, President of Argentina (1999-2001)
 Goh Chok Tong, Prime Minister of Singapore (1990-2004)
 Vicente Fox, President of Mexico (2000-2006)
 Oscar Arias, President of Costa Rica (1986-1990, 2006-2010)
 Shaukat Aziz, Prime Minister of Pakistan (2004-2007)
 Abdullah bin Haji Ahmad Badawi, Prime Minister of Malaysia (2003-2009)
 Tarja Halonen, President of Finland (2000-2012)
 Alain Juppé, Prime Minister of France (1995-1997)
 Seyed Mohammad Khātamī, President of Iran (1997-2005)
 Václav Klaus, President of the Czech Republic (2003-2013)
 Leonid Kuchma, President of Ukraine (1994-2005)
 Lee Hong-koo, Prime Minister of the Republic of Korea (1994-1995)
 Abdul Salam Majali, Prime Minister of Jordan (1993-1995, 1997-1998)
 John Major, Prime Minister of the United Kingdom (1990-1997)
 Péter Medgyessy, Prime Minister of Hungary (2002-2004)
 James Fitz-Allen Mitchell, Prime Minister of Saint Vincent and the Grenadines (1972-1974, 1984-2000)
 Benjamin William Mkapa, President of Tanzania (1995-2005)
 Andrés Pastrana, President of Colombia (1998-2002)
 Percival Noel James Patterson, Prime Minister of Jamaica (1992-2006)
 Romano Prodi, Prime Minister of the Republic of Italy (1996-1998, 2006-2008)
 Abdulaziz Al-Quraishi, Former Governor of the Saudi Arabian Monetary Authority (1974 - 1984)
 Jerry John Rawlings, Head of State of Ghana (1986-2000)
 José Sarney, President of Brazil (1985-1990)
 Gerhard Schröder, Chancellor of Germany (1998-2005)
 Konstantinos G. Simitis, Prime Minister of Greece (1996-2004)
 Tung Chee Hwa, Chief Executive of Hong Kong Administration (1997-2005)
 George Vassiliou, President of Cyprus (1988-1993)
 Vaira Vīķe-Freiberga, President of Latvia (1999-2007)
 Susilo Bambang Yudhoyono, President of Indonesia (2004-2014)
 Viktor Yushchenko, President of Ukraine (2005-2010)
 Ernesto Zedillo Ponce de Léon, President of Mexico (1994-1999)
 Viktor Zubkov, Prime Minister of Russia (2007-2008)

Post-mortem Members
 Takeo Fukuda 1905-1995, Founder and Prime Minister of Japan (1976-1978)
 Kiichi Miyazawa 1919-2007, Co-Chairman and Prime Minister of Japan (1991-1993)
 Helmut Schmidt 1918-2015, Honorary Chairman and Chancellor of West Germany (1974-1982)
 Malcolm Fraser, 1930-2015, Honorary Chairman and Prime Minister of Australia (1975-1983)
 Lord Callaghan of Cardiff 1912-2005, Prime Minister of the United Kingdom (1976-1979)
 Jean-Luc Dehaene, 1940-2014, Prime Minister of Belgium (1992-1999)
 Maria de Lourdes Pintasilgo 1930-2004, Prime Minister of Portugal (1979-1980)
 Lee Kuan Yew, 1923-2015, Prime Minister of Singapore (1959-1990)
 Shin Hyun-hwak 1920-2007, Prime Minister of the Republic of Korea (1979-1980)
 Nelson Mandela 1918-2013, President of South Africa (1994-1999)
 Misael Pastrana Borrero 1923-1997, President of the Republic of Colombia (1970-1974)
 Yevgeny M. Primakov 1929-2015, Prime Minister of the Russian Federation (1998-1999)
 Kalevi Sorsa 1930-2004, Prime Minister of the Republic of Finland (1972-1975, 1977-1979, 1982-1987)
 Pierre Elliott Trudeau 1919-2000, Prime Minister of Canada (1968-1979, 1980-1984)
 Richard von Weizsäcker 1920-2015, President of the Federal Republic of Germany (1984-1994)

Books
The InterAction Council released its first book in 2008 through the McGill-Queen's University Press in Canada, entitled Bridging the Divide: Religious Dialogue and Universal Ethics.

A second book, produced with the Walter and Duncan Gordon Foundation of Canada and the United Nations University Institute for Water, Environment and Health, was released in the fall of 2012, entitled: The Global Water Crisis: Addressing an Urgent Security Issue.

In 2014, the InterAction Council again partnered with the United Nations University Institute for Water, Environment and Health on the release of Global Agenda 2013: Water, Energy, and the Arab Awakening. Also in 2014, the Council published a book from its Interfaith Dialogue in Vienna, Austria in March of that year, entitled, Ethics in Decision-Making.

References

External links
InterAction Council Website
InterAction Council Members
InterAction Council Young Leadership Forum Papers 2008

International political organizations